Miami Township is one of the twelve townships of Greene County, Ohio, United States. As of the 2010 census the township population was 4,790, 1,199 of whom lived in the unincorporated portion.

Geography
Located in the northern part of the county, it borders the following townships:
Green Township, Clark County - northeast
Cedarville Township - southeast
Xenia Township - southwest
Bath Township - west
Mad River Township, Clark County - northwest

Two villages are located in Miami Township: part of Clifton in the northeast, and Yellow Springs in the center.

Name and history
Miami Township was established in 1808 from land given by Bath and Xenia townships. It takes its name from the Little Miami River.

Statewide, other Miami Townships are located in Clermont, Hamilton, Logan, and Montgomery Counties.

Government
The township is governed by a three-member board of trustees, who are elected in November of odd-numbered years to a four-year term beginning on the following January 1. Two are elected in the year after the presidential election and one is elected in the year before it. There is also an elected township fiscal officer, who serves a four-year term beginning on April 1 of the year after the election, which is held in November of the year before the presidential election. Vacancies in the fiscal officership or on the board of trustees are filled by the remaining trustees.

References

External links
Miami Township official website
County website

Townships in Greene County, Ohio
1808 establishments in Ohio
Townships in Ohio